The Batticaloa Fort was built by the Portuguese in 1628 and was captured by the Dutch on 18 May 1638. From 1795, the fort was used by the British.

The fort has a structure of four bastions and is protected by the Batticaloa Lagoon on two sides and a canal on the other two sides. The fort is still in reasonable condition and currently houses several local administrative departments of the Sri Lanka government in new buildings, which are located within the old structure.

Timeline 
Timeline of Batticaloa fort in colonial time.

 1622 – Construction began by Portuguese
 1628 – Construction completed
 1638 – Dutch captured
 1639 – Fort destroyed by Dutch
 1665 – Reconstruction started
 1682 – Renovation
 1707 – Front bastion and complex completed
 1766 – Ceded to Kandyan kingdom
 1796 – Captured by British

See also 
Forts of Sri Lanka
Batticaloa Gate

Picture gallery

References

External links 

 Web site of the World Monuments Fund.

British forts in Sri Lanka
Buildings and structures in Batticaloa
Dutch forts in Sri Lanka
Forts in Eastern Province, Sri Lanka
Portuguese forts in Sri Lanka
Archaeological protected monuments in Batticaloa District
Buildings and structures associated with the Dutch East India Company